Neuracanthus aculeatus is a species of plant in the family Acanthaceae. It is endemic to Yemen.  Its natural habitats are subtropical or tropical dry shrubland and subtropical or tropical dry lowland grassland. It is threatened by habitat loss.

References

Acanthaceae
Endemic flora of Socotra
Endangered plants
Taxonomy articles created by Polbot
Taxa named by Isaac Bayley Balfour